Albert Girard (born 18 August 1949) was a Canadian businessman and politician. Girard was a Progressive Conservative party member of the House of Commons of Canada.

Born in Saint John, New Brunswick, Girard represented New Brunswick's Restigouche riding since winning that seat in the 1984 federal election. He served in the 33rd Canadian Parliament before being defeated in the 1988 federal election by Guy Arseneault of the Liberal party.

External links
 

1949 births
Living people
Progressive Conservative Party of Canada MPs
Members of the House of Commons of Canada from New Brunswick
Politicians from Saint John, New Brunswick